(born on February 5, 1972, in Fukuoka, Japan) is a Japanese composer. Kubota has also worked on vocal music composition and arrangement for anime theme songs.

Both are opening theme songs for the anime adaptation of Aria.

Works
A Letter to Momo
A Whisker Away
Gensou Suikoden
Kaleido Star
Kannazuki no Miko
Macross Delta
Whispered Words
Photo Kano
Shattered Angels
Umibe no Étranger

References

1972 births
Alumni of the Royal Academy of Music
Anime composers
Japanese composers
Japanese women composers
Living people
Musicians from Fukuoka Prefecture
People from Fukuoka
21st-century Japanese women musicians